Al-Muwafaqiya Sport Club, is an Iraqi football team based in Wasit, that plays in the Iraq Division Two.

History
Al-Muwafaqiya Club was established in the Al-Muwafaqiya District in Wasit Governorate in 1995, and participated in the Iraq FA Cup in the 2001–02 and 2002–03 seasons. After several seasons, the team was able to qualify to play in the Iraq Division One. In the 2018–19 season, the team played in the Iraq Division One under the leadership of coach Ali Mansour and his assistants, Jabbar Ghafel and Adel Ataiwi, but could not qualify for the Iraqi Premier League after losing against Al-Numaniya 1–0 in the final stage.

Sports activity in Iraq stopped in March 2020 due to the COVID pandemic, and the 2019–20 Iraq Division One season was not held, then the Iraqi leagues returned to resume their activities in September 2020. In the 2020–21 season, the team played in the qualifying round for the Iraq Division One under the leadership of coach Hussam Alwan. In the first stage, the team was able to top its group and qualify for the second stage, after collecting 14 points. In the first match in the second stage of the league, the team managed to beat Al-Nasiriya 2–1, but then lost its matches and was unable to qualify for the final stage. In the final match, the team lost to Al-Nasiriya 2–0, after the number of players' injuries increased, and the number of substitute players was not enough to complete the lineup, then the referee ended the match in favor of Al-Nasiriya.

Managerial history
 Ali Mansour
 Hussam Alwan 
 Saad Rebeh

See also
 2001–02 Iraq FA Cup
 2002–03 Iraq FA Cup

References

External links
 Al-Muwafaqiya SC on Goalzz.com

Football clubs in Wasit